Howard J. Buss (born January 6, 1951 in Allentown, Pennsylvania) is an American composer of contemporary classical music. Buss’ works include instrumental solos, chamber music, symphonic, choral, and band works. His music has received awards, including from the 2011 Lieksa Brass Week Composition Competition in Finland, the 2015 American Trombone Workshop National Composition Competition, the National Flute Association’s Newly-Published Music Competition, the Erik Satie Mostly Tonal Award, State of Florida Fellowships, ASCAP Plus Awards., and The American Prize.

Early life
Howard J. Buss was the eldest of eight children and was raised in Emmaus, Pennsylvania, where he attended Emmaus High School. At age 14, he began his professional performing career as a member of a jazz band in Allentown and joined the American Federation of Musicians. Soon thereafter, Buss became a member of the Marine Band of Allentown and occasionally soloed with the group.

As he neared high school graduation, Buss was recruited as a trombonist by the nationally known group, the Tijuana Brats. In the three years he performed with the band he appeared numerous times on national television programs, including The Tonight Show, The Mike Douglas Show (multiple times), and The Jerry Lewis MDA Labor Day Telethon. He recorded with RCA Records in New York City and toured extensively.

College
In college, Buss shifted his focus from popular music and jazz to classical music. In 1972, he received his Bachelor of Arts in applied music performance from West Chester State College (now West Chester University), where he studied music composition. Shortly thereafter, he moved to East Lansing, Michigan, where in 1974 he was awarded a Master of Music in trombone performance from Michigan State University and studied with composer H. Owen Reed and was inspired to change his primary musical thrust from performance to composition. In 1975, he received a Master of Music in composition from Michigan State University and he married Judy (Epstein), a woodwind specialist. They moved to the Champaign–Urbana metropolitan area to attend the University of Illinois, where Howard received a Doctor of Musical Arts in composition in 1977. His music composition teachers at the University of Illinois included Salvatore Martirano. While there, his works began being published and noticed by the wider public.

After receiving his doctorate, Buss moved with his wife, Judy, to Lakeland, Florida, where they continue to reside.  In 1985, he established Brixton Publications (ASCAP) and Howard J. Buss Publications (BMI). The catalogs expanded to accommodate his compositions and those of other American composers. The companies were sold to Cimarron Music Press of New London, Connecticut in October 2021. Buss continues to accept commissions to compose new compositions.

Works
The following is a partial chronological list of Buss' works:

 Coexistence for clarinet and 4 percussion, 1983
 Trombone Concerto version for trombone and piano, 1985 and version for trombone and band, 1986
 Sonic Fables: “Lessons from Aesop” for brass quintet and one percussion, 1992
 Modern Times for narrator, flute, and four percussion, duration: 30’, 1995
 Millennium Visions for clarinet and string quartet, 2000
 The Heavens Awaken for bassoon and string quartet, 2009
 Cosmic Portraits in 2 versions: for flute, clarinet, alto sax, and tenor sax; and flute, oboe, clarinet, and bassoon, 2010
 Brom Bones in versions for trombone octet, 2005; and 10-part brass choir, 2010
 Three Euphonics for solo euphonium, 2011
 Jazzical #4 for horn, trombone, tuba, and piano, 2012
 Crossroads for trombone choir and percussion ensemble, 2012
 St. Francis and the Animals for flute, clarinet, and harp, 2013
 Energico for band, 2014
 Reflective Journey" for horn and 4 percussion, 2015
 Alien Loop de Loops for trombone and electronic recording, 2015
 Constellations for flute, piano, and percussion, 2015
 The Enchanted Garden for bassoon and string trio, 2016
 Interstellar for horn, tuba, and electronic recording, 2016
 Zephyrs of the Dawn for flute choir, 2017
 Serendipity Suite for trumpet, trombone, and piano, 2017
 Another World Stood Here for flute choir, 2018
 Concerto for Marimba and Percussion Ensemble 2018
 Into the Hall of Valor for horn and band, 2018
 Brass Miniatures for brass quintet, 7'33", 2019
 Concertante in 2 versions: for euphonium, tuba, and piano; and euphonium, tuba, and orchestra 9', 2019
 Reflections on the "Last Post" in 2 versions: for tuba and piano; and tuba and band 8', 2019
 Totally Tubular for oboe/English horn and trumpet/flugelhorn, 8'05", 2019
 Bassoonisms for 4 bassoons, 8', 2019
 Reflections on the "Last Post in 2 versions: for clarinet and piano; and clarinet and band, 8'05", 2019
 Skylines for flute, oboe, English horn, clarinet, bass clarinet, and bassoon, 10'30", 2019
 Aquarius for saxophone trio (alto, tenor & baritone) 7', 2020
 Sonic Tapestries for violin, alto sax, and piano, 11'15", 2020
 Visitations from the Dark for alto sax, bass clarinet, and piano, 11'30", 2020
 Color'tudes for bass clarinet and piano, 2021
 Divergences for clarinet and viola, 2021
 Gemtones for two clarinets and bassoon (or bass clarinet), 2021
 On the Stroke of Midnight for solo horn, 2021
 Tribute to Stephen Foster for brass quintet, 2021
 La Sonata modello for solo piano, 2021
 Toccata and Retro-Invention for solo piano, 2021
 Trigon for trumpet, trombone, and tuba, 2021

 Discography 
 Alien Loop de Loops for horn and electronic recording on ALIEN LOOP DE LOOPS, performed by Erika Loke, available on Spotify, Amazon, and Apple Music.
 Alpine Spring for flute and harp on the CD "Flauto e arpa" from Bottega Discantica Records of Milan, Italy. Performed by Elena Cecconi, flute; and Paola Devoti, harp. "Flauto e arpa” BDI 188.
 Atmospheres for trumpet and one percussion is recorded on 3 different CDs - PL Productions DT002 - ATMOSPHERES, performed by Sheryl Linch, trumpet, and Don N. Parker, percussion; and on IBS Classical Records (Spain) - SPANISH MEMOIRS, performed by Diego Arias, trumpet and Yu-Jung Chung, percussion - INCANTATION by the Samodai-Szives Duo of Budpest, Hungary.
 Awakening for solo harp on the CD, JEWISH MEMORIES, performed by harpist Paola Devoti on La Bottega Discantica Records (Milan, Italy) BDI 248.
 Ballad for bass trombone and piano MOVING ON featuring Jonathan Warburton on bass trombone.
 Currents for four percussion - Capstone Records CPS-8735 - HOWARD J. BUSS: MODERN TIMES.
 Dances and Interludes for solo guitar - NIGHT DANCES - 4-Tay Records CD4061, performed by Robert Phillips.
 Dragon Flight for flute and piano - FLUTE AND PIANO - La Bottega Discantica Records (Milan, Italy) BDI 237, performed by Elena Cecconi, flauto and Federico Brunello, piano.
 Fantasie for flute and piano - DUX Recording Producers, Warszawa, POLAND - on the CD FANTAISIE, performed by Agata Igras-Sawicka,flute, and Mariusz Rutkowski, piano - DUX 0658.
 Four Miniatures for two bassoons - DUETTINO - Soundview Multimedia CD. Performed by Arnold Irchai and Tama Kott.
 Hurricane! for solo flute - FLAUTOSOLO from Bottega Discantica Records of Milan, Italy. Performed by Elena Cecconi. "FlautoSolo" BDI 187.
 Incantation for trumpet and percussion - recorded on four different CDs: on PL Productions DT001 - DOUBLE TAKE featuring Sheryl Linch, trumpet, and Don N. Parker, percussion; on Equilibrium Records EQ58 OLD NEWS: New Music for Trumpet and Percussion, performed by Steven Dunn and John Pennington; on IBS Classical (Spain) Records SPANISH MEMOIRS, performed by Diego Arias, trumpet, and Yu-Jung Chung, percussion and on INCANTATION by the Samodai-Szives Duo of Budpest, Hungary.
 Modern Times for flute, narrator and 4 percussion - Capstone Records CPS-8735 - HOWARD J. BUSS: MODERN TIMES.
 Moon Glow for flute and piano - on the CD "SOGNANDO LO SPAZIO - Performed by Elena Cecconi and Tim Carey- Urania Records (Italy)
 Mysterious Exit for solo flute and percussion quartet - C. Alan Publications Label PREMIERS, VOL. 1, performed by Kim McCormick, flute, with the University of South Florida Percussion Ensemble.
 Night Flight for piccolo, clarinet, and piano - Crystal Records CD713 - TAKE WING, performed by Lois Bliss Herbine, piccolo; Allison Herz, clarinet; and Charles Abramovic, piano.
 Night Tide for trombone and marimba - IBS Classical Records (Spain) SPANISH MEMOIRS, performed by Manuel Quesada Benitez, trombone, and Yu-Jung Chung, marimba.
 Overture for Percussion (4 percussion) - Capstone Records CPS-8735 - HOWARD J. BUSS: MODERN TIMES.
 Pipe Dream for solo flute - Capstone Records CPS-8721 - TWILIGHT REMEMBERED: The McCormick Duo, Kim McCormick, flute.
 Rite of Passage for solo marimba - IBS Classical Records (Spain) - SPANISH MEMOIRS, performed by Yu-Jung Chung, marimba.
 Scenes from the Holy Land (flute and percussion) - Capstone Records CPS-8735 - HOWARD J. BUSS: MODERN TIMES.
 Seaside Reflections for flute and harp - Albany Records - ALLUME, performed by Brian Luce, flute, and Carrol McLaughlin, harp.
 Sonic Fables: Lessons from Aesop - Granada Brass B-12180-2021 - 20, performed by the Granada Brass with Ana Hernandez Sanchiz, narrator and Yolanda Chung, percussion.
 Spanish Memoirs on IBS Classical Records (Spain) - SPANISH MEMOIRS, performed by Diego Arias, trumpet and percussionists Yu-Jung Chung, Antonio Jose Herrera Molina, Daniel Jesus Martin, and Jorge Cano Rodriguez.
 Stellar Visions for flute and marimba - Ravello Records (PARMA) RR-7814 - MCDUO, performed by the McCormick Duo.
 Three Character Sketches for solo viola -THREE CHARACTER SKETCHES- performed by Emanuel Oliveri, available on Spotify.
 Venetian Memoirs for solo flute, the third movement "The Train Ride Home" - De Ferrari Publications (Genoa, Italy) - ARABESCHI E GEOMETRIE performed by Elena Cecconi.
 Wave Train'' for flute and marimba - HoneyRock RM01 - PREMIERS PLUS ONE The McCormick Flute and Percussion Duo.

References

External links 

The Subito Store
Video Collection of Music by Howard J. Buss

1951 births
Living people
21st-century American composers
21st-century American male musicians
American male composers
Contemporary classical music performers
Emmaus High School alumni
Michigan State University alumni
Musicians from Allentown, Pennsylvania
West Chester University alumni
University of Illinois at Urbana–Champaign School of Music alumni